The Konzertexamen is a degree at conservatoires in postgraduate courses of study. 

As a postgraduate education degree, it is the highest degree to be awarded by the university. The postgraduate course leading to the concert examination serves to train highly talented students in instrumental or singers skills to become concert-ready soloists. The concert exam usually consists of two parts: The first part is an internal university event, the second part a public concert. The Hochschule für Musik Freiburg evaluates the examination performances with the grades "passed with distinction", "passed very well", "passed" and "failed". The Hochschule für Musik Detmold and the Hochschule für Musik Saar award only three grades: "passed with distinction", "passed" and "failed". The  awards a Konzertexamen only a "pass" or "fail".

Information pages on the Konzertexamen degree at various conservatoires (selection)

References 

Examinations
Music education in Germany